A fast-neutron reactor (FNR) or fast-spectrum reactor or simply a fast reactor is a category of nuclear reactor in which the fission chain reaction is sustained by fast neutrons (carrying energies above 1 MeV or greater, on average), as opposed to slow thermal neutrons used in thermal-neutron reactors. 
Such a fast reactor needs no neutron moderator, but requires fuel that is relatively rich in fissile material when compared to that required for a thermal-neutron reactor.
Around 20 land based fast reactors have been built, accumulating over 400 reactor years of operation globally. The largest of this was the Superphénix Sodium cooled fast reactor in France that was designed to deliver 1,242 MWe.
Fast reactors have been intensely studied since the 1950s, as they provide certain decisive advantages over the existing fleet of water cooled and water moderated reactors. These are:
 More neutrons are produced when a fission occurs, resulting from the absorption of a fast neutron, than the comparable process with slow (thermal, or moderated) neutrons. Thus, criticality is easier to attain than with slower neutrons.
 All fast reactor design built to this date use liquid metals as coolant, such as the sodium fast reactor and the Lead-cooled fast reactor. As the boiling points of these metals is very high, the pressure in the reactor can be maintained at a low level, which improves safety considerably. 
 As temperatures in the core can also be substantially higher than in a water cooled design, such reactors have a greater thermodynamic efficiency; a larger percentage of the heat generated is turned into usable electricity.
 Atoms heavier than uranium have a much greater chance of fission with a fast neutron, than with a thermal one. This means that the inventory of heavier atoms in the nuclear waste stream, for example Curium, is greatly reduced, leading to a substantial lower waste management requirement.

In the GEN IV initiative, about two thirds of the proposed reactors for the future use a fast spectrum for these reasons.

In order to describe the properties of a fast reactor design, an overview of neutron moderated reactor properties is first needed.

Fission processes 

Fast reactors operate by the fission of uranium and other heavy atoms, similar to thermal reactors. However, there are crucial differences, arising from the fact that by far most commercial nuclear reactors use a moderator, and fast reactors do not.

Moderators in conventional nuclear reactors

Natural uranium consists mostly of two isotopes:

 99.3% 
 0.7% 

Of these two,  undergoes fission only by fast neutrons. 
When the uranium undergoes fission, it releases neutrons with a high energy ("fast").
However, these fast neutrons have a much lower probability of causing another fission than neutrons which are slowed down after they have been generated by the fission process.

The common solution to this problem is to slow the neutrons down using a neutron moderator, which interacts with the neutrons to slow them. Other moderators include heavy water, beryllium and graphite. The elastic scattering of the neutrons can be likened to the collision of two ping pong balls; when a fast ping pong ball hits one that is stationary or moving slowly, they will both end up having about half of the original kinetic energy of the fast ball. This is in contrast to a fast ping pong ball hitting a bowling ball, where the ping pong ball keeps virtually all of its energy.

In this case, only the  has a high probability of fission. 

About 73% of the  created this way will undergo fission from capturing a thermal neutron while the remaining 27% absorbs a thermal neutron without undergoing fission,  is created, which rarely fissions with thermal neutrons. When Plutonium-240 in turn absorbs a thermal neutron to become a heavier isotope  which is also fissionable with thermal neutrons very close in probability to Plutonium-239.

These effects combined have the result of creating, in a light water moderated reactor, the presence of the transuranic elements. Such isotopes are themselves unstable, and undergo Beta decay to create ever heavier elements, such as Americium and Curium.
Thus, in moderated reactors, plutonium isotopes in many instances do not fission (and so do not create new neutrons), but instead just absorb the neutrons. Most moderated reactors use low enriched fuel. As power production continues, around 12–18 months of stable operation in light water moderated reactors, the thermal nuclear reactor both consumes more fissionable material than it breeds and accumulated neutron absorbing fission products which make it difficult to sustain the fission process, and the reactor has to be refueled.

Drawbacks of light water as the moderator in conventional nuclear reactors

The following disadvantages of the use of a moderator have instigated the research and development of fast reactors.

Although cheap, readily available and easily purified, light water can absorb a neutron and remove it from the reaction.

Other thermal neutron designs use different moderators, like heavy water or graphite that are much less likely to absorb neutrons, allowing them to run on natural uranium fuel. See CANDU, X-10 Graphite Reactor. In either case, the reactor's neutron economy is based on thermal neutrons.

A second drawback of using water for cooling is that it has a relatively low boiling point. The vast majority of electricity production uses steam turbines. These become more efficient as the pressure (and thus the temperature) of the steam is higher. A water cooled and moderated nuclear reactor therefore needs to operate at high pressures to enable the efficient production of electricity. Thus, such reactors are constructed using very heavy steel vessels, for example 30 cm (12 inch) thick. This high pressure operation adds complexity to reactor design and requires extensive physical safety measures. 
The vast majority of nuclear reactors in the world are water cooled and moderated with water. Examples include the PWR, the BWR and the CANDU reactors. In Russia and the UK, reactors are operational that use graphite as moderator, and resp. water and gas as coolant.

As the operational temperature and pressure of these reactors is dictated by engineering and safety constraints, both are limited. Thus, the temperatures and pressures that can be delivered to the steam turbine are also limited. In a modern PWR, around 30-33 % of the nuclear heat is converted into electricity.

A third drawback is that when a (any) nuclear reactor is shut down after operation, the fuel in the reactor no longer undergoes fission processes. However, there is an inventory present of highly radioactive elements, some of which generate substantial amounts of heat. If the fuel elements were to be exposed (i.e. there is no water to cool the elements), this heat is no longer removed. The fuel will then start to heat up, and temperatures can then exceed the melting temperature of the zircaloy cladding. When this occurs the fuel elements melt, and a meltdown occurs, such as the multiple meltdowns that occurred in the Fukushima disaster. This relatively low temperature, combined with the thickness of the steel vessels used, could lead to problems in keeping the fuel cool, as was shown by the Fukushima accident.

Lastly, the fission of uranium and plutonium in a thermal spectrum yields a smaller number of neutrons than in the fast spectrum, so in a fast reactor, more losses are acceptable.

The proposed fast reactors solve all of these problems (next to the fundamental fission properties, where for example plutonium 239 is more likely to fission after absorbing a fast neutron, than a slow one.)

Fast fission and breeding

Although  and  have a lower capture cross section with higher-energy neutrons, they still remain reactive well into the MeV range. In fact, in the fast spectrum, when  captures a fast neutron it will also undergo fission at a low rate with the remainder of captures being "radiative" and entering the decay chain to Plutonium-239.

Crucially, when a reactor runs on fast neutrons, the  isotope is likely to fission 74% of the time instead of the 62% of fissions when it captures a thermal neutron. In addition the probability of a  upon absorbing a fast neutron fissioning is 70% while for a thermal neutron it is less than 20%. Fast neutrons have a smaller chance of being captured by the uranium and plutonium, but when they are captured, have a significantly higher probability of causing a fission. The inventory of spent fast reactor fuel therefore contains virtually no actinides except for uranium and plutonium, which can be effectively recycled. Even when the core is initially loaded with 20% mass reactor-grade plutonium (containing on average 2% , 53% , 25% , 15% , 5%  and traces of ), the fast spectrum neutrons are capable of causing each of these to fission at significant rates.

By removing the moderator, the size of the reactor core volume can be greatly reduced, and to some extent the complexity. As  and particularly  are far more likely to fission when they capture a fast neutron, it is possible to fuel such reactors with a mixture of plutonium and natural uranium, or with enriched material, containing around 20% . As new fuel is created during the operation, this process is called breeding. All fast reactors can be used for breeding, or by carefully selecting the materials in the core and eliminating the blanket they can be operated to maintain the same level of fissionable material without creating any excess material. This is a process called Conversion because it transmutes fertile materials into fissile fuels on a 1:1 basis.

The blanket material can then be processed to extract the new fissile material, which can then be mixed with depleted uranium to produce MOX fuel, mixed with lightly enriched Uranium fuel to form REMIX fuel both for conventional slow-neutron reactors. Alternatively it can be mixed as in greater percentage of 17%-19.75% fissile fuel for fast reactor cores. A single fast reactor can thereby supply its own fuel indefinitely as well as feed several thermal ones, greatly increasing the amount of energy extracted from the natural uranium. The most effective breeder configuration theoretically is able to produce 14  nuclei for every 10 (14:10) actinide nuclei consumed, however real world fast reactors have so far achieved a ratio of 12:10 ending the fuel cycle with 20% more fissile material than they held at the start of the cycle. Less than 1% of the total Uranium mined is consumed in a thermal once-through cycle, while up to 60% of the natural uranium is fissioned in the best existing fast reactor cycles. 

Given the current inventory of spent nuclear fuel (which contains reactor grade plutonium), it is possible to process this spent fuel material and reuse the actinide isotopes as fuel in a large number of fast reactors. Enormous amounts of energy are still present in the spent reactor fuel inventories; if fast reactor types were to be employed to use this material, that energy can be extracted for useful purposes.

Waste recycling

Fast-neutron reactors can potentially reduce the radiotoxicity of nuclear waste. Each commercial scale reactor would have an annual waste output of a little more than a ton of fission products, plus trace amounts of transuranics if the most highly radioactive components could be recycled. The remaining waste should be stored for about 500 years.

With fast neutrons, the ratio between splitting and the capture of neutrons by plutonium and the minor actinides is often larger than when the neutrons are slower, at thermal or near-thermal "epithermal" speeds. Simply put, fast neutrons have a smaller chance of being absorbed by plutonium or Uranium, but when they are, they almost always cause a fission.
The transmuted even-numbered actinides (e.g.) split nearly as easily as odd-numbered actinides in fast reactors. After they split, the actinides become a pair of "fission products". These elements have less total radiotoxicity. 
Since disposal of the fission products is dominated by the most radiotoxic fission products, strontium-90, which has a half life of 28.8 years, and caesium-137, which has a half life of 30.1 years, the result is to reduce nuclear waste lifetimes from tens of millennia (from transuranic isotopes) to a few centuries. The processes are not perfect, but the remaining transuranics are reduced from a significant problem to a tiny percentage of the total waste, because most transuranics can be used as fuel.

Fast reactors technically solve the "fuel shortage" argument against uranium-fueled reactors without assuming undiscovered reserves, or extraction from dilute sources such as granite or seawater. They permit nuclear fuels to be bred from almost all the actinides, including known, abundant sources of depleted uranium and thorium, and light-water reactor wastes. On average, more neutrons per fission are produced by fast neutrons than from thermal neutrons. This results in a larger surplus of neutrons beyond those required to sustain the chain reaction. These neutrons can be used to produce extra fuel, or to transmute long half-life waste to less troublesome isotopes, as was done at the Phénix reactor in Marcoule, France, or some can be used for each purpose. Though conventional thermal reactors also produce excess neutrons, fast reactors can produce enough of them to breed more fuel than they consume. Such designs are known as fast breeder reactors.

In the spent fuel from water moderated reactors, several plutonium isotopes are present, along with the heavier, transuranic elements. Nuclear reprocessing, a complex series of chemical extraction processes, mostly based on the PUREX process,  can be used to extract the unchanged uranium, the fission products, the plutonium, and the heavier elements. Such waste streams can be divided in categories; 
1) Unchanged uranium 238, which is the vast bulk of the material and has a very low radioactivity,
2) a collection of fission products and 
3) the transuranic elements.

Coolant

All nuclear reactors produce heat which must be removed from the reactor core. Water, the most common coolant in thermal reactors, is generally not feasible for a fast reactor, because it acts as a neutron moderator.

All operating fast reactors are liquid metal cooled reactors. The early Clementine reactor used mercury coolant and plutonium metal fuel. In addition to its toxicity to humans, mercury has a high cross section (thus, it readily absorbs the radiation, which causes nuclear reactions) for the (n,gamma) reaction, causing activation in the coolant and losing neutrons that could otherwise be absorbed in the fuel, which is why it is no longer considered as a coolant.

Russia has developed reactors that use Molten lead and lead-bismuth eutectic alloys, which have been used on a larger scale in naval propulsion units, particularly the Soviet Alfa-class submarine, as well as some prototype reactors. 
Sodium-potassium alloy (NaK) is popular in test reactors due to its low melting point.

Another proposed fast reactor is a molten salt reactor, in which the salt's moderating properties are insignificant.

Gas-cooled fast reactors have been the subject of research commonly using helium, which has small absorption and scattering cross sections, thus preserving the fast neutron spectrum without significant neutron absorption in the coolant.  

However, all large-scale fast reactors have used molten metal coolant. Advantages of molten metals are low cost, the small activation potential and the large liquid ranges. The latter means that the material has a low melting point, and a high boiling point. Examples of these reactors include Sodium cooled fast reactor, which are still being pursued worldwide. Russia currently operates two such reactors on a commercial scale. 
Additionally, Russia has around eighty reactor years of experience with the Lead-cooled fast reactor which is rapidly gaining interest.

Fuel
In practice, sustaining a fission chain reaction with fast neutrons means using relatively enriched uranium or plutonium. The reason for this is that fissile reactions are favored at thermal energies, since the ratio between the  fission cross section and  absorption cross section is ~100 in a thermal spectrum and 8 in a fast spectrum. Therefore a fast reactor cannot run on natural uranium fuel. However, it is possible to build a fast reactor that breeds fuel by producing more than it consumes. After the initial fuel charge such a reactor can be refueled by reprocessing. Fission products can be replaced by adding natural or even depleted uranium without further enrichment. This is the concept of the fast breeder reactor or FBR.

So far, most fast-neutron reactors have used either MOX (mixed oxide) or metal alloy fuel. Soviet fast-neutron reactors used (high  enriched) uranium fuel initially, then in 2022 switched to using MOX. The Indian prototype reactor uses uranium-carbide fuel.

While criticality at fast energies may be achieved with uranium enriched to 5.5 (weight) percent uranium-235, fast reactor designs have been proposed with enrichments in the range of 20 percent for reasons including core lifetime: if a fast reactor were loaded with the minimal critical mass, then the reactor would become subcritical after the first fission. Rather, an excess of fuel is inserted with reactivity control mechanisms, such that the reactivity control is inserted fully at the beginning of life to bring the reactor from supercritical to critical; as the fuel is depleted, the reactivity control is withdrawn to support continuing fission.

Control
Like thermal reactors, fast-neutron reactors are controlled by keeping the criticality of the reactor reliant on delayed neutrons, with gross control from neutron-absorbing control rods or blades.

They cannot, however, rely on changes to their moderators because there is no moderator. So Doppler broadening in the moderator, which affects thermal neutrons, does not work, nor does a negative void coefficient of the moderator. Both techniques are common in ordinary light-water reactors.

Doppler broadening from the molecular motion of the fuel, from its heat, can provide rapid negative feedback. The molecular movement of the fissionables themselves can tune the fuel's relative speed away from the optimal neutron speed. Thermal expansion of the fuel can provide negative feedback. Small reactors as in submarines may use Doppler broadening or thermal expansion of neutron reflectors.

Resources 
As the perception of the reserves of uranium ore in the 1960s was rather low, and the rate that nuclear power was expected to take over baseload generation, through the 1960s and 1970s fast breeder reactors were considered to be the solution to the world's energy needs. Using twice-through processing, a fast breeder increases the energy capacity of known ore deposits, meaning that existing ore sources would last hundreds of years. The disadvantage to this approach is that the breeder reactor has to be fed fuel that must be treated in a spent fuel treatment plant. It was widely expected that this would still be below the price of enriched uranium as demand increased and known resources dwindled.

Through the 1970s, experimental breeder designs were examined, especially in the US, France and the USSR. However, this coincided with a crash in uranium prices. The expected increased demand led mining companies to expand supply channels, which came online just as the rate of reactor construction stalled in the mid-1970s. The resulting oversupply caused fuel prices to decline from about US$40 per pound in 1980 to less than $20 by 1984. Breeders produced fuel that was much more expensive, on the order of $100 to $160, and the few units that reached commercial operation proved to be economically unfeasible.

Advantages 

Fast reactors are widely seen as an essential development because of several advantages over moderated designs. The most studied and built Fast reactor type is the Sodium-cooled fast reactor. Some of the advantages of this design are discussed below; other designs such as the Lead-cooled fast reactor have similar advantages.

 A fission event creates more neutrons than in the thermal reactor. This gives flexibility and allows breeding of uranium.
 As  becomes slightly reactive to fast neutrons, a significant percentage of the fission events in the reactor occur with this isotope.
 There is a fine balance between the production of neutrons from fission on the one hand, and the many processes that remove them from the equation on the other. If the temperature increases in a fast reactor, this will have two effects:
 Doppler broadening of the neutron spectrum, and 
 a very small increase in the physical size of the reactor core. 
 These two effects serve to reduce the reactivity because it allows more neutrons to escape the core, as was shown in a demonstration at EBR-II in 1986. In this test, the additional heat was readily absorbed by the large volume of liquid sodium, and the reactor shut itself down, without operator interference.

 As no water is present in the core at high temperatures, the reactor is essentially at atmospheric pressure. Most often, an inert gas blanket at a modest pressure (e.g. 0.5 atmospheres) is present to ensure that any leak results in mass transport to the outside of the reactor. This means that there is no pressure vessel with associated problems (high pressure systems are complex), nor will a leak from the reactor emit high pressure jets.
 The entire vessel being at atmospheric pressure, and the sodium is very hot, and can be allowed to remain at these temperatures even in shutdown, passive cooling (i.e. no pumping requirements) with air is possible. Accidents such as the Fukushima Daiichi nuclear accident  are impossible with such a design.
 The higher temperature of the liquid metal, and therefore the higher temperature of the steam generated by this liquid metal, allows a considerable increase in the electric generating efficiency (around 40% thermal efficiency, as opposed to 30% ).
 Such reactors have the potential to significantly reduce the waste streams from nuclear power, while at the same time increasing vastly the fuel utilization.

Disadvantages

As most fast reactors to date have been either sodium, lead or lead-bismuth cooled, the disadvantages of such systems are described here.

 As a result of running the reactors on fast neutrons, the reactivity of the core is determined by these neutrons, as opposed to moderated reactors. In the moderated reactors, a significant amount of control of the reactivity is obtained from delayed neutrons, which allow time for operators or computers to adjust reactivity. As delayed neutrons play virtually no role in fast reactors, other mechanisms are required for the very short term reactivity control (e.g within one second) in fast reactors, which are thermal expansion and Doppler broadening. Longer term reactivity is obtained from control rods, which are filled with a neutron absorption material.
 As the entire reactor is filled with large volumes of molten metal, refuelling is not trivial, as optical tools (cameras, etc.) are of no use. Costly, carefully calibrated and positioned robotic tools are needed for the operation of refueling. Also, completely removing fuel elements from the reactor is not easy.
 The fact that the entire reactor is filled with a metal that has a melting point much higher than room temperature, all the tubing, heat exchangers, and the entire reactor volume must be heated electrically, before any nuclear operation can take place. However, once the reactor produces heat, this is no longer of any concern.
 To date most fast reactor types have proven costly to build and operate, and are not very competitive with thermal-neutron reactors unless the price of uranium increased dramatically, or building costs decreased. It is thought that given the perception of problematic nuclear waste disposal, such reactors will be necessary. As moderated reactor construction costs are rising (among other) due to ever more stringent safety mechanisms, this could mean a better economic viability of fast reactors.
 Sodium is often used as a coolant in fast reactors, because it does not moderate neutron speeds much and has a high heat capacity. However, it burns and foams in air, although the combustion reaction of sodium in air should not be confused with the extremely violent reaction of sodium and water. Sodium leaks can ignite with air, causing difficulties in reactors such as (e.g. USS Seawolf (SSN-575) and Monju).
 Some sodium-cooled fast reactors have operated safely for long periods (notably the Phénix and EBR-II for 30 years, or the BN-600 and BN-800 in operation since resp. 1980 and 2016, despite several minor leaks and fires. It is important to note that sodium leaks (and possibly fires) do not release radioactive elements, as the sodium fast reactors are always designed with a two loop system.

 Since liquid metals other than lithium and beryllium have low moderating ability, the primary interaction of neutrons with fast reactor coolant is the (n,gamma) reaction, which induces radioactivity in the coolant. Sodium-24 is created in the reactor loop of the sodium cooled fast reactor, from natural sodium-23 by neutron bombardment. As the half life of this isotope is very short, after e.g. two weeks, almost no  is left. Fast spectrum reactors that use sodium must remove this magnesium from the sodium, which is achieved with a 'cold' trap.
 From the liquid lead or liquid lead-bismuth fast reactor designs, only the liquid eutectic lead-bismuth will have activation. As pure lead will have virtually no activation, a pure lead reactor design could operate in a single loop, saving significant costs on heat exchangers and separate systems.
 A defective fast reactor design could have positive void coefficient: boiling of the coolant in an accident would reduce coolant density and thus the absorption rate. No such designs are proposed for commercial service, as they are potentially dangerous and undesirable from a safety and accident standpoint. This can be avoided with a gas-cooled reactor, since voids do not form in such a reactor during an accident; however, reactivity control in a gas cooled fast reactor is difficult.
 Due to the low cross sections of most materials at high neutron energies, critical mass in a fast reactor is much higher than in a thermal reactor. In practice, this means significantly higher enrichment: >20% enrichment in a fast reactor compared to <5% enrichment in typical thermal reactors. Alternatively, a mixture of plutonium from nuclear waste, combined with natural or depleted uranium could be used.

History

US interest in breeder reactors were muted by Jimmy Carter's April 1977 decision to defer construction of breeders in the US due to proliferation concerns, and the suboptimal operating record of France's Superphénix reactor. The French reactors also met with serious opposition of environmentalist groups, who regarded these as very dangerous. Despite such setbacks, a number of countries still invest in the fast reactor technology. Around 25 reactors have been built since the 1970s, accumulating over 400 reactor years of experience.

A 2008 IAEA proposal for a Fast Reactor Knowledge Preservation System noted that:
during the past 15 years there has been stagnation in the development of fast reactors in the industrialized countries that were involved, earlier, in intensive development of this area. All studies on fast reactors have been stopped in countries such as Germany, Italy, the United Kingdom and the United States of America and the only work being carried out is related to the decommissioning of fast reactors. Many specialists who were involved in the studies and development work in this area in these countries have already retired or are close to retirement. In countries such as France, Japan and the Russian Federation that are still actively pursuing the evolution of fast reactor technology, the situation is aggravated by the lack of young scientists and engineers moving into this branch of nuclear power. 

As of 2021, Russia operates two fast reactors on commercial scale. The GEN IV initiative, an international working group on new reactor designs has proposed six new reactor types, three of which would operate with a fast spectrum.

List of fast reactors

Decommissioned reactors

United States
Clementine was the first fast reactor, built in 1946 at Los Alamos National Laboratory. It used plutonium metal fuel, mercury coolant, achieved 25 kW thermal and used for research, especially as a fast neutron source.
Experimental Breeder Reactor I (EBR-I) at Argonne West, now Idaho National Laboratory, near Arco, Idaho, in 1951 became the first reactor to generate significant amounts of power. Decommissioned in 1964.
Fermi 1 near Detroit was a prototype fast breeder reactor that powered up in 1957 and shut down in 1972.
Experimental Breeder Reactor II (EBR-II) at Idaho National Laboratory, near Arco, Idaho, was a prototype for the Integral Fast Reactor, 1965–1994.
SEFOR in Arkansas, was a 20 MWt research reactor that operated from 1969 to 1972.
Fast Flux Test Facility (FFTF), 400 MWt, operated flawlessly from 1982 to 1992, at Hanford Washington. It used liquid sodium drained with argon backfill under care and maintenance.
SRE in California, was a 20 MWt, 6.5 MWe commercial reactor operated from 1957 to 1964.
LAMPRE-1 was a molten plutonium fueled 1 MWth reactor.  It operated as a research reactor from 1961-1963 at Los Alamos national Lab.

Europe
Dounreay Loop type Fast Reactor (DFR), 1959–1977, was a 14 MWe and Prototype Fast Reactor (PFR), 1974–1994, 250 MWe, in Caithness, in the Highland area of Scotland.
Dounreay Pool type Fast Reactor (PFR), 1975–1994, was a 600 MWt, 234 MWe which used mixed oxide (MOX) fuel.
Rapsodie in Cadarache, France, (20 then 40 MW) operated between 1967 and 1982.
Superphénix, in France, 1200 MWe, closed in 1997 due to a political decision and high costs.
Phénix, 1973, France, 233 MWe, restarted 2003 at 140 MWe for experiments on transmutation of nuclear waste for six years, ceased power generation in March 2009, though it will continue in test operation and to continue research programs by CEA until the end of 2009. Stopped in 2010.
KNK-II, in Germany a 21 MWe experimental compact sodium-cooled fast reactor operated from Oct 1977-Aug 1991. The objective of the experiment was to eliminate nuclear waste while producing energy.  There were minor sodium problems combined with public protests which resulted in the closure of the facility.

USSR/Russia
Small lead-cooled fast reactors were used for naval propulsion, particularly by the Soviet Navy.
BR-5 - was a research-focused fast-neutron reactor at the Institute of Physics and Energy in Obninsk from 1959-2002.
BN-350 was constructed by the Soviet Union in Shevchenko (today's Aqtau) on the Caspian Sea, It produced 130 MWe plus 80,000 tons of fresh water per day.
IBR-2 - was a research focused fast-neutron reactor at the Joint Institute of Nuclear Research in Dubna (near Moscow).
RORSATs - 33 space fast reactors were launched by the Soviet Union from 1989-1990 as part of a program known as the Radar Ocean Reconnaissance Satellite (RORSAT) in the US.  Typically, the reactors produced approximately 3 kWe.
BES-5 - was a sodium cooled space reactor launched as part of the RORSAT program which produced 5 kWe.  
BR-5 - was a 5 MWt sodium fast reactor operated by the USSR in 1961 primarily for materials testing.
Russian Alpha 8 PbBi - was a series of lead-bismuth cooled fast reactors used aboard submarines. The submarines functioned as killer submarines, staying in harbor then attacking due to the high speeds achievable by the sub.

Asia
Monju reactor, 300 MWe, in Japan, was closed in 1995 following a serious sodium leak and fire. It was restarted on May 6, 2010 but in August 2010 another accident, involving dropped machinery, shut down the reactor again. As of June 2011, the reactor had generated electricity for only one hour since its first test two decades prior.
Aktau Reactor, 150 MWe, in Kazakhstan, was used for plutonium production, desalination, and electricity.  It closed 4 years after the plant's operating license expired.

Never operated
Clinch River Breeder Reactor, United States
Integral Fast Reactor, United States. Design emphasized fuel cycle based on on-site electrolytic reprocessing. Cancelled in 1994 without construction.
SNR-300, Germany

Active 

BN-600 - a pool type sodium-cooled fast breeder reactor at the Beloyarsk Nuclear Power Station. It provides 560 MWe to the Middle Urals power grid. In operation since 1980.
BN-800 - a sodium-cooled fast breeder reactor at the Beloyarsk Nuclear Power Station. It generates 880 MW of electrical power and started producing electricity in October, 2014. It reached full power in August, 2016.
BOR-60 - a sodium-cooled reactor at the Research Institute of Atomic Reactors in Dimitrovgrad, Russia. In operation since 1968. It produces 60MW for experimental purposes.
FBTR - a 40MWt,13.2MWe experimental reactor in India which focused on reaching significant burnup levels.
China Experimental Fast Reactor, a 60 MWth, 20 MWe, experimental reactor which went critical in 2011 and is currently operational. It is used for materials and component research for future Chinese fast reactors.
KiloPower/KRUSTY is a 1-10 kWe research sodium fast reactor built at Los Alamos National Laboratory.  It first reach criticality in 2015 and demonstrates an application of a Stirling power cycle.

Under repair
, 1977–1997 and 2004–2007, Japan, 140 MWt is an experimental reactor, operated as an irradiation test facility. After an incident in 2007, the reactor was suspended for repairing, recoworks were planned to be completed in 2014.

Under construction
PFBR, Kalpakkam, India, 500 MWe reactor with criticality planned for 2021.  It is a sodium fast breeder reactor.
CFR-600, China, 600 MWe.
MBIR Multipurpose fast neutron research reactor. The Research Institute of Atomic Reactors (NIIAR) site at Dimitrovgrad in the Ulyanovsk region of western Russia, 150 MWt. Construction started in 2016 with completion scheduled for 2024.
BREST-300, Seversk, Russia. Construction started at 8 June 2021

In design 
BN-1200, Russia, built starting after 2014, with operation planned for 2018–2020, now delayed until at least 2035.
Toshiba 4S was planned to be shipped to Galena, Alaska (USA) but progress stalled (see Galena Nuclear Power Plant)
KALIME is a 600 MWe project in South Korea, projected for 2030. KALIMER is a continuation of the sodium-cooled, metal-fueled, fast-neutron reactor in a pool represented by the Advanced Burner Reactor (2006), S-PRISM (1998-present), Integral Fast Reactor (1984-1994), and EBR-II (1965-1995).
Generation IV reactor (helium·sodium·lead cooled) US-proposed international effort, after 2030.
JSFR, Japan, a project for a 1500 MWe reactor began in 1998, but without success.
ASTRID, France, canceled project for a 600 MWe sodium-cooled reactor.
Mars Atmospherically Cooled Reactor (MACR) is a 1 MWe project, planned to complete in 2033. MACR is a gas-cooled (carbon dioxide coolant) fast-neutron reactor intended to provide power to proposed Mars colonies.
TerraPower is designing a molten salt reactor in partnership with Southern Company, Oak Ridge National Laboratory, Idaho National Laboratory, Vanderbilt University and the Electric Power Research Institute. They expect to begin testing a loop facility in 2019 and is scaling up their salt manufacturing process. Data will be used to assess thermal hydraulics and safety analysis codes.
Elysium Industries is designing a fast spectrum molten salt reactor.
ALFRED (Advanced Lead Fast Reactor European Demonstrator) is a lead cooled fast reactor demonstrator designed by Ansaldo Energia from Italy, it represents the last stage of the ELSY and LEADER projects.

Planned
Future FBR, India, 600 MWe, after 2025

Chart

See also
Energy amplifier
Fast breeder reactor
Gas-cooled fast reactor
Generation IV reactor
Lead-cooled fast reactor
Nuclear fuel cycle
Sodium-cooled fast reactor
Thermal-neutron reactor

References

External links
https://www.amazon.com/Concepts-Behind-Breeder-Reactor-Design/dp/3659180009
ANL report on EARLY SOVIET FAST REACTORS
Article on recent work on fast-neutron reactors in Scientific American, December, 2005
IAEA Fast Reactor Database
Fast Reactor Data Retrieval and Knowledge Preservation seeks to establish a comprehensive, international inventory of fast reactor data and knowledge, which would be sufficient to form the basis for fast reactor development in 30 to 40 years from now.
World Nuclear Association: Fast-Neutron Reactors 
International Thorium Energy Organisation

 
Soviet inventions